The Anglican Church of Southern Africa has its own calendar of saints.

History 

The calendar of the Anglican Church of Southern Africa was published in 1989 in the book An Anglican Prayer Book 1989.

Characteristics

See also 
 Anglican Church of Southern Africa
 Liturgical Calendars of the Communion

References

South African
Anglican Church of Southern Africa